The Alliance of Women Film Journalists Award for Best Woman Director is an annual award given by the Alliance of Women Film Journalists. The award is often referred to as an EDA as a tribute to AWFJ founder Jennifer Merin's mother, actress Eda Reiss Merin. EDA is also an acronym for Excellent Dynamic Activism.

Winners
 "†" indicates Academy Award-winning direction.
 "‡" indicates Academy Award-nominated direction.

2000s

2010s

2020s

See also

 List of media awards honoring women

References

 Alliance of Women Film Journalists official website

Alliance of Women Film Journalists
American film awards
Awards for best director
Mass media awards honoring women
Women film directors